The greedy olalla rat (Olallamys edax) is a species of rodent in the family Echimyidae. It is found in Colombia and Venezuela. Its natural habitat is subtropical or tropical moist lowland forests.

The species name edax is a Latin word meaning greedy.

References

Olallamys
Mammals of Colombia
Mammals of Venezuela
Mammals described in 1916
Taxa named by Oldfield Thomas
Taxonomy articles created by Polbot